Hayl can refer to:
Al Hayl, a settlement in Fujairah, United Arab Emirates.
HAYL Group, Information Technology Company In Egypt.